The Nationalist activism was an elitist political movement of the early 20th century in Scandinavia, Finland and the Baltic countries. The Activists advocated in brief a close cooperation with Imperial Germany, and active support of Germany's military aims — primarily directed against Imperial Russia, Bolshevist Russia and the Soviet Union. The activism was revived in both Finland and Sweden in connection with the Winter War.

This activism was ideologically related, although distantly, to the thoughts that would result in Fascism in Italy. Activists were often ardent anti-Socialists and deeply suspicious of democracy and parliamentarism.

In Scandinavia, activist policies were judged unsuccessful when occasionally (half-ways) implemented, as in the years before the dissolution of the union between Sweden and Norway and in Sweden in the first two years of World War I; but in Finland the Activism was seen as successful in establishing the White Guard, the German-trained Jägers, the victory in the Finnish Civil War, and the thereby secured independence.

While in Finland the activism would continue in movements of the interbellum: the Academic Karelia Society, the Lapua movement and the Patriotic People's Movement; in the Baltic countries and Sweden it hardly survived outside some narrow circles of military officers, industrialists and aristocrats with political ambitions.

In Latvia Nationalist activism was represent by Pērkonkrusts.

In Estonia, it was Nationalistic Vaps Movement.

See also
 Nationalism, for nationalist movements in general
 Activism, for other meanings of activism

Activism
Nationalism